Donald Joseph Tyndall (born June 14, 1970) is an American basketball coach currently working as the head coach for Chipola College of the NJCAA. Tyndall played college basketball at Iowa Central Community College and Morehead State and has been a basketball coach since 1994. His teams are known for pressing and playing an unconventional match-up zone, a highly successful variation of the defensive system employed by coach Rick Pitino at Louisville.

Tyndall began his coaching career at the junior college level, first as an assistant at Iowa Central Community College from 1994 to 1996. He had his first head coaching position in the 1996–97 season at St. Catharine College, where he had 30 wins. Tyndall moved up to the NCAA level as an assistant coach at LSU, Idaho, and Middle Tennessee from 1997 to 2006.

Returning to his alma mater, Tyndall was head coach at Morehead State from 2006 to 2012. Tyndall turned around a losing program into a top performer in the Ohio Valley Conference. In six seasons, he had 114 wins and two NCAA Tournament appearances, including an upset of no. 4 seed Louisville in the 2011 tournament. From 2012 to 2014, Tyndall was head coach at Southern Miss; he was head coach at Tennessee in the 2014–15 season. However, violations of academic eligibility and financial aid rules came to light in 2015, causing Tyndall to be fired from Tennessee after one season. In 2016, the NCAA found Tyndall liable for the violations, vacating all of his wins at Southern Miss and banning him from the collegiate coaching ranks for 10 years.

Coaching career

As an assistant / Junior College head coach
After graduating from Morehead State University in 1993, Tyndall began coaching at the junior college level. From 1994 to 1996, he was assistant coach at Iowa Central Community College. Tyndall had his first head coaching position in the 1996–97 season at St. Catharine College in Springfield, Kentucky. Tyndall led St. Catharine to a 30–5 record and the school's first-ever NJCAA tournament appearance. In 1997, Tyndall earned NJCAA Region 7 National Coach of the Year and Kentucky Junior College Coach of the Year honors.

After his season at St. Catharine, Tyndall got his first NCAA Division I coaching position as an assistant at  LSU under John Brady, a position he would hold from 1997 to 2001. Tyndall helped LSU finish first in the SEC West Division in the 1999–00 season and make the Sweet 16 round of the 2000 NCAA tournament. This LSU team also featured Stromile Swift, the #2 pick in the 2000 NBA draft.

In the 2001–02 season, Tyndall served as associate head coach at Idaho under Leonard Perry. 

From 2002 to 2006, Tyndall was associate head coach at Middle Tennessee under Kermit Davis. Middle Tennessee had winning seasons all four of those seasons.

Morehead State (2006–2012)
In his first Division I head coaching job, Tyndall served as head coach at his alma mater Morehead State from 2006 to 2012. Morehead State under Tyndall won the Ohio Valley Conference tournaments of 2009 and 2011 and earned automatic NCAA Tournament bids those years. Morehead State also made the 2010 College Basketball Invitational. 

In August 2010, the NCAA placed Morehead State on two years' probation for violations by boosters. As a #13 seed, Morehead State upset #4 seed Louisville 62-61 in the first round of the 2011 NCAA tournament.

Southern Miss (2012–2014)
Tyndall was the head coach at the Southern Miss from 2012 to 2014. Southern Miss made the National Invitation Tournament in 2013 and 2014 and finished first in Conference USA standings for the 2013–14 season. Tyndall went 56–17 as head coach at Southern Miss, but in 2016, the NCAA vacated all 56 wins due to academic fraud.

Tennessee (2014–2015)
On April 22, 2014, Tyndall was hired as head basketball coach at the University of Tennessee, after spending the previous two seasons as the head basketball coach at Southern Miss. Tennessee finished 16–16 in what would be Tyndall's only season as head coach.

On March 27, 2015, Tennessee fired Tyndall after the NCAA notified Tennessee officials of possible major violations at Southern Miss relating to academic ineligibility and improper financial aid.  According to a copy of Tyndall's termination letter, Tyndall had lied to Tennessee officials about the extent of the violations on several occasions. Athletics director Dave Hart said that Tyndall would likely have faced significant discipline from the NCAA for his role in the violations at Southern Miss and would have never hired Tyndall had the true extent of the violations at Southern Miss been known. 

Tyndall was the second Tennessee coach to be ensnared in a major NCAA infractions scandal, following Bruce Pearl. According to ESPN, Hart and other officials were still smarting from Pearl having to sit out eight SEC games for violations related to his own scandal. They were unwilling to face the prospect of Tyndall facing an equally lengthy suspension.

NCAA sanctions
On April 8, 2016, the NCAA imposed a 10-year show-cause penalty on Tyndall, to run until April 7, 2026–at the time, tied for the longest ever imposed on a head coach. This means that any NCAA member school that wants to hire him during this period will have to "show cause" for why it shouldn't be sanctioned for doing so, and could incur severe penalties if he commits another violation during this time.  It also stipulates that any penalties imposed on Tyndall will follow him to any NCAA member school if he is ever hired again. 

According to the NCAA, Tyndall told his assistants to complete papers for players, and also arranged payments to players and tried to cover them up.  The NCAA deemed Tyndall's violations to be as egregious as those committed by Dave Bliss at Baylor 16 years earlier; at the time, Bliss was the only other head coach to be slapped with a show-cause lasting 10 or more years. The NCAA added two unprecedented stipulations to Tyndall's show-cause. It required any NCAA member school who hires Tyndall during his show-cause to suspend him from coaching duties–effectively banning him from coaching at any NCAA member school until the end of the 2025–26 season.  This was very unusual since Tyndall would have likely found it difficult to return to the collegiate ranks in any event while his show-cause was in effect. A show-cause usually has the effect of blackballing a coach from the collegiate ranks at least for the duration of the show-cause; most schools will not even consider hiring a coach with such a severe penalty on his record. The NCAA also decreed that if Tyndall ever coaches again at an NCAA member school after the show-cause runs out, he must sit out the first half of the first season of his return. However, it is very difficult for a head coach to return to the collegiate ranks even after a show-cause expires; only four have ever done so.

USA Today called Tyndall's show-cause the most severe penalty that the NCAA has ever meted out to a head coach.

As a professional coach
On November 4, 2016, Tyndall was hired by the Toronto Raptors to be an assistant coach on their development team, Raptors 905. Toronto Raptors head coach Dwane Casey was fired in May 2018 and was then hired as the head coach of the Detroit Pistons; Tyndall then took an assistant coaching role with Grand Rapids Drive, the development team for the Pistons. After one season, he was promoted to head coach of the Drive for the 2019–20 season.

Return to College 
On June 17, Tyndall was hired by Chipola College as the head men’s basketball coach. Tyndall replaced Brendan Foley who became an assistant at Buffalo.

Head coaching record

Junior college

College

 Southern Miss's original records were 27–10 (12–4, 2nd in C-USA) in 2012–13 and 29–7 (13–3, 1st in C-USA) in 2013–14. However, all 56 wins from those seasons were vacated by the NCAA due to participation of academically ineligible players.

References

External links
 Tennessee Volunteers bio
 Morehead State Eagles bio
 Middle Tennessee Blue Raiders bio
 Idaho Vandals bio
 LSU Tigers bio

1970 births
Living people
American men's basketball coaches
Basketball coaches from Michigan
Basketball players from Grand Rapids, Michigan
College men's basketball head coaches in the United States
Idaho Vandals men's basketball coaches
Junior college men's basketball coaches in the United States
Junior college men's basketball players in the United States
LSU Tigers basketball coaches
Middle Tennessee Blue Raiders men's basketball coaches
Morehead State Eagles men's basketball coaches
Morehead State Eagles men's basketball players
NCAA sanctions
People from Muskegon County, Michigan
Raptors 905 coaches
Southern Miss Golden Eagles basketball coaches
Sportspeople from Grand Rapids, Michigan
Tennessee Volunteers basketball coaches